MS  Mega Smeralda is a cruiseferry owned by Medinvest and operated by Corsica Ferries - Sardinia Ferries. She was built in 1985 by Wärtsilä at the Helsinki New Shipyard in Helsinki, Finland, for Johnson Line as MS Svea for use in Silja Line traffic. Between 1992 and 1994, she sailed for Silja Line as MS Silja Karneval and, between 1994 and 2008, for Color Line as MS Color Festival.

History

Silja Line service

MS Svea and her sister MS Wellamo were modeled after Silja Line's highly successful Helsinki–Stockholm service ferries MS Finlandia and MS Silvia Regina. Between the two classes, the aesthetic differences are the most notable; whilst the Finlandia and her sister followed a "form follows function" design philosophy resulting in a very boxy design for the ships, the new sisters for the Turku–Stockholm routing followed a more rounded and smoother, and overall much less hostile, design.

In 1989, there were plans to rebuild Svea with rails on the cardeck so that she could also carry railroad carriages on board, but these were shelved. Until 1990, her funnel displayed the colours of Johnson Line, but at that time Silja Line's owners Johnson Line and Effoa merged into one company, EffJohn, and Silja Line's seal logo was moved from the ship's hulls into their funnels.

In 1992, Svea and her sister underwent a large-scale reconstruction at Lloyd Werft in Bremerhaven, Germany, where most of the ships' interiors were rebuilt, a new "skybar" added on deck 9, a new more blue-dominated colour scheme replaced the traditional Silja stripes and the ship was renamed Silja Karneval in accordance with Silja's new name policy. In fact, the funds used to rebuild Svea and Wellamo were originally meant for the rebuilding of the GTS Finnjet, but her planned rebuilding would have been too expensive and EffJohn opted to spend what money they had on Svea and Wellamo instead.

Color Line service

Silja Karnevals service with Silja proved to be short. In early 1994, EffJohn decided to sell her sister Silja Festival to the Norway-based Color Line. However, when time came to deliver the ship to Color Line, EffJohn for some reason decided to sell them Silja Karneval instead (the two ships being structurally identical). Problematically for Color Line, it had already printed material advertising its new ship as the Color Festival. As result Silja Karneval became M/S Color Festival, not Color Karneval as would have been logical.

After reconstruction at Cityvarvet, Gothenburg, Color Festival was initially placed on the Oslo–Hirtshals route. In 2002,  one of her rudders was damaged in Hirsthals and she had to be docked in Hamburg because of it. In April 2006, she started operating on the Oslo–Fredrikshavn route in direct competition with her old Silja Line fleetmate MS Stena Saga. On 21 November 2007, Color Line sold Color Festival to Corsica Ferries for €49 million (400 million Norwegian krone), in preparation for the delivery of the new Color Superspeed vessels in mid-2008.

Corsica Sardinia Ferries service
The Color Festival was delivered to Corsica Sardinia Ferries in early January 2008, subsequently renamed Mega Smeralda and re-flagged in Italy with Genoa as her homeport. Reportedly, she was to be placed on Civitavecchia – Golfo Aranci or Livorno – Golfo Aranci service. In 2011, the ferry operated between Tolone, Ajaccio, Bastia, Nice, etc..

2013 Tour de France
In June 2013, the Tour de France visited Corsica for the first time. To accommodate the Tour entourage, the organisers chartered the Mega Smeralda to house members of the organisation, media and others who worked on the Tour and to host press conferences, although the riders stayed in hotels in Porto-Vecchio.

References

External links 

Corsica Ferries (Company website)
M/S Svea (1985) at Fakta om Fartyg 

Cruiseferries
Ships built in Helsinki
1984 ships
Former Color Line ships